The British Journal of Medical Practitioners is a quarterly peer-reviewed online medical journal published by JMN Medical Education. It covers all branches of medicine. The journal is abstracted and indexed in Scopus, Embase, CAB Abstracts, EBSCO databases, Global Health, and Chemical Abstracts Service. The editors-in-chief are Javed Latoo and Nadeem Mazi-Kotwal.

References

External links 
 

General medical journals
Quarterly journals
Open access journals
Publications established in 2008
English-language journals